Hypolimnas usambara, the red spot diadem or Usambara diadem, is a butterfly in the family Nymphalidae. It is found along the coast of Kenya and in Tanzania, from the coast inland to the Usambara Mountains of Tanga Region. The habitat consists of primary coastal forests.

The larvae feed on Urera hypselodendron.

References

Butterflies described in 1872
usambara
Butterflies of Africa
Taxa named by Christopher Ward (entomologist)